Roy Clark (1933–2018) American country musician/TV host.

Roy Clark or Clarke may also refer to:

Roy Clark (police officer), head of Scotland Yard's anti-corruption squad
Roy Clyde Clark (1920–2014), bishop of the United Methodist Church in the U.S.
Roy Clark (baseball) (1874–1925), baseball player
Roy Peter Clark (born 1948), American writer, editor and writing coach
Roy Clarke (born 1930), British TV comedy writer
Roy Clarke (footballer) (1925–2006), Welsh footballer
Roy S. Clarke, American geochemist

See also
Roy Clark Senior Challenge, golf tournament